Epipsestis bisociata is a moth in the family Drepanidae. It is found in Vietnam and Hunan, China.

References

Moths described in 2000
Thyatirinae